Lorraine Broussard Nicholson (born April 16, 1990) is an American actress and director. She is known for playing Alana Blanchard in the biographical film Soul Surfer (2011).

Early life
Nicholson was born in Los Angeles to actors Jack Nicholson and Rebecca Broussard. She was named after her father's aunt. She has a younger brother, Raymond, as well as two older half-siblings; a half-sister, Jennifer Nicholson and a half-brother, Caleb Goddard. She was four years old when her parents separated. In 2008, she graduated from Brentwood School in Brentwood, California.

Career
Nicholson's first on-screen appearance was as an extra, at the age of 13, in her father's movie Something's Gotta Give. In 2008, she provided the voice of Katie in the animated film Fly Me to the Moon.

After mostly minor roles as a child actor, Nicholson landed her first major role in Soul Surfer, playing Bethany Hamilton's best friend Alana Blanchard, who was there to help her after a shark attack took her left arm. As Blanchard was a competitive surfer, Nicholson had to take a crash course in wave riding.

Nicholson starred in Anonymous (2016), playing an expert hacker.

Nicholson wrote, produced and directed a 15-minute coming-of-age drama titled The Instant Message. She later directed and wrote a short film titled This Magic Moment. In 2017, Nicholson released her third short film, Life Boat, which premiered at the 2017 Tribeca Film Festival.

Personal life
Nicholson served as Miss Golden Globe at the 2007 Golden Globe Awards ceremony.

In May 2012, she graduated from Brown University with a degree in Literary Arts, intending on being a screenwriter. In a 2011 interview, Nicholson stated, "I love to act and I also hope to one day write and direct and create my own projects. I feel that in the film industry, especially as a woman, it's really important to make your own luck – and create projects to give other people really strong opportunities as well as yourself." In 2017, Nicholson was accepted into the AFI Directing Workshop for Women, a mentorship and education program geared towards female filmmaking.

Filmography

References

External links
 

 

1990 births
21st-century American actresses
Actresses from Los Angeles
American child actresses
American film actresses
Brown University alumni
Living people